Krause Springs (Crow-zee) is a camping and swimming site located in the Hill Country of Texas. The  property has 32 springs, and several feed the man-made pool and the natural pool which flow into Lake Travis. Two springs feed the 70' by 20' swimming pool at a rate of 70 gallons per minute at a temperature of about 70 degrees.

Krause Springs is listed on the National Register of Historic Places and has been privately owned by the Krause family for over 50 years.

References

External links
 

Protected areas of Burnet County, Texas